The University of Tabriz (Danushgah-e Tebriz) is a public university located in Tabriz, East Azerbaijan, with the fundamental aim of creating a center of excellence in higher education and research. It is one of the top five high-ranked universities in Iran and one of the ten most selective universities in the country. The University of Tabriz is the second-oldest university in Iran after the University of Tehran, and has the second largest campus area in the country which is the biggest academic institution in northwest of the country. The university is also a member of the Caucasus University Association.

Today, Funding for the University of Tabriz is provided by the Ministry of Science, Research and Technology. Admission to the university for Iranian applicants is through national entrance examination which is administered annually by the Ministry of Science, Research and Technology and for international applicants through some exclusive regulations.

History

The history of the higher education in Tabriz, well known for being a cradle of civilization for centuries, goes back to 720 years ago when the Rab' l-Rashidi international complex was founded. Inheriting this background, the University of Tabriz, founded in 1947, is the second oldest university in Iran. The university started its activities under the name of the University of Azarabadegan with Faculties of Medicine, Agriculture, and Pedagogy in 1946, after legislation of the Establishment of the Universities in the Cities act by the National Parliament of Iran. The University of Azarabadegan was renamed as the University of Tabriz following the 1979 Islamic Revolution. In 1985 and following the approval of Islamic parliament all the faculties and centers affiliated to medical sciences in Iran were separated and started their work independently under the title of medical universities. Thereafter, Tabriz University of Medical Sciences was separated from the University of Tabriz and continued its activities under the supervision of the ministry of health and medical education.

Academic profile
It is now educating more than 24,000 undergraduate and postgraduate students, with over 800 academic staff of whom about 750 are Ph.D. holders. Out of this teaching staff, 195 are full professors, 315 are associate professors, 270 are assistant professors and the remaining are instructors. A body of over 1,000 personnel is supporting academic activities. Today, the university provides both undergraduate and graduate programs in 22 main departments. The student body consists of about 14,000 undergraduate students and 7,000 graduate students from all over the country.

University entrance exam

Undergraduate admission to the University of Tabriz is limited to the top 3 percent of students who pass the national entrance examination administered annually by the Iranian Ministry of Science, Research, and Technology. For some competitive fields, it has to be between 1 percent. The participants of this exam must answer the questions of physics, mathematics and chemistry well in order to get admission. The master and doctorate exams are similar and the participants answer the specialized questions of their fields.

Reputation
The university is known to be strict and usually, the grade point average (GPA) of students is lower than their peers in other Iranian universities. Also the university has its own rules for grading(GPA), which is different from the system of most universities in the world. University of Tabriz is well known as a tough university with a low GPA especially in Civil, Electrical and Mechanical engineering. As such, many students of University of Tabriz believe their grades do not reflect their academic performance.

Education and research
University of Tabriz has several research centers, including Center of Excellence in Mechatronics Systems, Center for Applied Physics and Astronomical Research, Biotechnology Center for Pharmaceutical Herbs, Research Center for Fundamental Sciences, Geographic Research Center, Three-Scholars Research Center (Se-Allameh Tabrizi), Center for Social Research, Center for History and Culture as well as Khaje-Nasireddin Toosi Observatory.

Statistics of researches

Based on the online statistics of the scientific measurement and ranking department of the university, CIVILICA database, which announces the number of articles produced in conferences in Iran, University of Tabriz with approximately 22,900 national articles and 19,600 international articles, It ranks 6th among the country's public universities in terms of the number of articles, journals and conferences.

Campuses
The University of Tabriz has its main campus in Tabriz, as well as three other satellite campuses, Aras International Campus, Miyaneh Technical College, and Marand Technical College, which in total area make up the second largest campus after Isfahan University of Technology in Iran.
 Main Campus in Tabriz
 Aras International Campus
 Miyaneh Technical College
 Marand Technical College

Also, University of Tabriz is the helper of universities in the northwest of Iran and supports and establishes schools in different cities. Mohaghegh Ardabili University, University of Maragheh and University of Bonab have branched from this university.

Faculties and Colleges

 Ahar Faculty of Agriculture
 Faculty of Agriculture
 Faculty of Veterinary Medicine
 Faculty of Biology
 Faculty of Chemical and Petroleum Engineering
 Faculty of Chemistry
 Faculty of Civil Engineering
 Faculty of Planning and Environmental Sciences
 Faculty of Economics, Management & Business
 Faculty of Education & Psychology
 Faculty of Electrical & Computer Engineering
 Faculty of Engineering – Emerging Technologies
 Faculty of Law & Social Sciences
 Faculty of Mathematical Sciences
 Faculty of Mechanical Engineering
 Faculty of Natural Sciences
 Faculty of Persian & Foreign Languages
 Faculty of Physical Education & Sports Science
 Faculty of Physics

World rankings

In 2021, Performance Ranking of Scientific Papers for World Universities(NTU Ranking) ranked University of Tabriz 701-750th in the world. On 15 December 2021, University Ranking by Academic Performance(URAP) ranked University of Tabriz 589th in the world. The 2022 edition of the U.S. News & World Report Best Global University Ranking ranked it 684th in the category "Best Global Universities", with a score of 47.1. Based on SCImago Institutions Rankings, University of Tabriz's overall rank is 631st in the world in 2022.

Ranking in Iran  
University of Tabriz is always a top 10 university in Iran and was ranked 5th among the comprehensive universities. Sixteen faculty members were among one percent top scientists of the world in 2021. Based on Thomson Reuters, it was included among the most influential universities in the world and ranked 4th among Iranian comprehensive universities.

Subject ranking
U.S. News & World Report in 2022

Times Higher Education World University Rankings in 2022

Academic Ranking of World Universities in 2022

Institutes
Due to its research work, the university is recognized as a Center of Excellence for six fields: Geographical Studies of Northwest Iran; Biology; Mechatronics; Molecular Plant Breeding; New Materials and Clean Chemistry; and Photonics and Plasma. Several research centres are housed on campus, including the Centre of Excellence in Mechatronics Systems, the Centre for Applied Physics and Astronomical Research, and the Biotechnology Centre for Pharmaceutical Herbs.
 Center of Excellence in Mechatronics Systems
 Applied Physics and Astronomy
 Fundamental Science
 Geography
 Iranian History and Culture
 Islamic & Humanity Science
 Social Science
 Environment

International collaboration 
University of Tabriz has an active role in international associations, e.g. International Universities Council (IUC), Eurasian Silk Road Universities Consortium (ESRUC), and Association of Caucasian Universities (KUNIB). Furthermore, University of Tabriz was the full member of the Administrative Board of International Association of Universities (IAU) from 2008 to 2012. Moreover, it has signed 90 MOU with different universities in the world to conduct joint programs.

In the CWTS Leiden Ranking 2022 (in indicator of international collaboration), University of Tabriz ranked 581st of the world and 8th of Iran. The number of international students in university of Tabriz is over 1100 people.

University notables

Chancellors

Notable alumni
University of Tabriz alumni 
 Samad Behrangi – Iranian writer and social critic
 Azim Gheychisaz – Iranian mountain climber
 Faraj Sarkohi – Iranian journalist and literacy critic
 Gholam Hossein Saedi – writer and playwright
 Hooshang Amirahmadi – political analyst, president of the American-Iranian council
 Mehdi Bakeri – former chief commander of Islamic Revolutionary Guard Corps
 Ali Akbar Entezami – father of the chemistry and polymer science of Iran
 Ali Saeedlou – Vice-president of Iran
 Ali Abdolalizadeh – former housing minister of Iran
 Easmaeil Jabbarzadeh – governor of East Azerbaijan
 Ebrahim Rezaei Babadi – politician, governor-general of Kermanshah Province
 Kaveh Madani –  Deputy Head of Iran's Department of Environment.

See also
 Education in Iran
 Higher education in Iran
 International rankings of Iran 
 Tabriz University of Medical Sciences
List of Iranian scientists
Modern Iranian scientists and engineers

References

External links

 tabrizu.ac.ir, official website (Persian language)
 tabrizu.ac.ir/en, official website (English language)
 Alumni Association of the Technical Faculty of University of Tabriz (Persian language)

 
Educational institutions established in 1947
Buildings and structures in Tabriz
1947 establishments in Iran
Tourist attractions in Tabriz